Elections to Dartford Borough Council were held on 1 May 2003.  The whole council was up for election on new boundaries, which reduced the total number of seats from 47 to 44. The election in Longfield, New Barn and Southfleet ward was postponed following the death of Bob Dunn, one of the Conservative candidates. The delayed election returned three Conservative councillors, increasing their number to 21.

Labour lost their majority on the council, putting it into no overall control. The Conservatives and Swanscombe & Greenhithe Residents Association subsequently formed a coalition to control the council.

Election result

|}

Ward results

External links
Dartford Council Results

Dartford
2003
2000s in Kent